Alphia Possamai-Inesedy is an Australian sociologist who is Director of the Sydney City Campus at the University of Western Sydney. She is the Vice President of the Australian Sociological Association.

Education 
In 1999, Possamai-Inesedy received a Bachelor of Arts in Sociology and Psychology. In 2000, she was awarded a first-class honours award in Sociology. In 2005, Possamai-Inesedy received her PhD from the University of Western Sydney. Her thesis was titled Risk within the Confines of Safety: An Analysis of Current Pregnancy and Birthing Practcies of Australian Women.

Career 
In 2009, Possamai-Inesedy was co-creator of the Risk Societies Thematic Group, a sub-group of the Australian Sociological Association. Between 2013 and 2016. Possamai-Inesedy was the editor-in-chief of the Journal of Sociology.  She is a co-editor for the Religion, Spirituality and Health: A Social Scientific Approach series published by Springer.

Possamai-Inesedy was responsible for the development of the Master of Research at Western Sydney University. In 2014, Possamai-Inesedy appeared on Radio National talking about how factual information is used to win arguments.

Personal life
Possamai-Inesedy is married to fellow academic Adam Possamai.

Publications 
 Possamai-Inesedy, A. and Nixon, A. (2019), The Digital Social: Religion and Belief, : Walter de Gruyter 9783110499872.
 Henslin, J., Possamai, A. and Possamai-Inesedy, A. (2014), Sociology, : Pearson 9781442558830.
 Henslin, J., Possamai, A. and Possamai-Inesedy, A. (2010), Sociology: A Down-To-Earth Approach: Pearson 9781442517813.

References 

Living people
Australian sociologists
Australian women sociologists
Year of birth missing (living people)
Academic journal editors
Western Sydney University alumni
Academic staff of Western Sydney University